The Modern Nepal Academy (मोडर्न नेपाल एकेडेमी) is a secondary school situated at Dallu Aawas, Ward No. 15 Kathmandu (West), Nepal.

Homepage: http://www.mna.edu.np

Schools in Kathmandu